(1887 - October 10, 1972), born in Iwanai District, Hokkaidō, helped to establish what became the Scout Association of Japan. He was Japan's first Chief Scout.

Background
His father, participated in the  organization from the Kanezawa han, which developed land to make it suitable for habitation.

Scouting

In 1920, from July 30 to August 7, he participated in the first World Scout Jamboree, held in London. The other participants from Japan were Koshiba Hiroshi and Richard Suzuki. He also met Sir Robert Baden-Powell.

In 1928, while climbing the Niseko mountain range, he discovered a beautiful marsh area. Moved by its beauty, he named it , meaning "a marsh where gods and sennin live."

Legacy
The Shimoda Toyomatsu Memorial Hall, Kutchan, Abuta District, Hokkaidō is named in his honor.

Related books 
  (Kuniichi Komachi, Kuni Scouting Library)

References
Much of this information in this article was translated from the equivalent article in the Japanese Wikipedia, as referenced on October 28, 2006

Scouting in Japan
1887 births
1972 deaths
Japanese writers
Scouting pioneers
Chief Scouts